Atoconeura pseudeudoxia is a species of dragonfly in the family Libellulidae. It is native to Zambia, the Republic of the Congo, the Democratic Republic of the Congo, and Uganda. It lives along the banks of mountain forest streams. In general it is widespread, but in some parts of Uganda it is threatened by the degradation of its habitat.

References

Libellulidae
Insects described in 1953
Taxonomy articles created by Polbot